Globus Hypermarket Holding (Globus SB-Warenhaus Holding GmbH & Co. KG), branded as Globus,  is a German retail chain of hypermarkets, DIY stores and electronics stores.

History

In 1828, Franz Bruch (1801–1865) opened a grocery store under his own name in Sankt Wendel, a town in northeastern Saarland, Germany. Management of the company passed to his son Joseph Adam Bruch (1837–1905) in 1865. Joseph Karl Bruch (1873–1949), the founder's grandson, took over from his father in 1905. Since then, the company has developed from being a retailer only and expanded into wholesale. On 1 February 1949, Joseph died and his two sons, Franz-Josef and Dr Walter Bruch (1913–1999), took over the company, now converted to a limited-liability company. In 1953 the company opened its first self-service grocery at its  headquarters under the name "A. Backhaus KG".

On 1 July 2020, Thomas Bruch handed over the management of Globus Holding to his son Matthias Bruch. In August 2020, Globus SB department stores joined the RTG (Retail Trade Group) retail cooperation, currently one of the largest retail cooperations in Germany. At the end of 2020, the Federal Cartel Office Globus approved the takeover of up to 24 Real stores.

Globus around the world

Controversy 

Despite Russia's invasion of Ukraine in 2022, Globus Group continues operations in Russia, which has drawn criticism. Despite the public pressure, the managing director Matthias Bruch wants to continue the business in Russia for financial reasons.

Gallery

References

External links
 Official website (Germany)
 Official website (Czech Republic)
 Official website (Russia)

Companies based in Saarland
German brands
Supermarkets of Germany
Supermarkets of Russia
Supermarkets of the Czech Republic